

This is a list of games for the Commodore Amiga computer system, organised alphabetically by name. See Lists of video games for related lists.

P

Pacific Islands
Pac-Land
Pac-Mania
Paladin
Paladin 2
Panzer Battles
Panzer Kick Boxing
Paperboy
Paperboy 2
Pandora
Paradroid 90
Paragliding Simulation
Paramax
Paranoia Complex, The
Parasol Stars
Paris Dakar 90
Patrician, The
Pawn, The
Payback
Pegasus
Penguins
Penthouse Hot Numbers
Penthouse Hot Numbers Deluxe
Percy E. Nash's International Soccer
Perfect General, The
Perihelion: The Prophecy
Persian Gulf Inferno
Personal Nightmare
Peter Beardsley's International Football
PGA European Tour
PGA Tour Golf
Phantasie
Phantasie 2
Phantasie 3
Phantom Fighter
Pharaoh's Curse
Phobia
Photopia
Pinball Brain Damage
Pinball Dreams
Pinball Fantasies
Pinball Illusions
Pinball Magic
Pinball Mania
Pinball Prelude
Pinball Wizard
Pink Panther
Pinkie
Pioneer Plague
Pipemania
Piracy on the High Seas
Pirates Classic
Pit-Fighter
Pizza Tycoon
Plague, The
Plan 9 from Outer Space
Player Manager
Plotting
Police Quest: In Pursuit of the Death Angel
Police Quest II: The Vengeance
Police Quest III: The Kindred
Pool of Radiance
Pools of Darkness
Pop Up
Popeye 2
Popeye 3: WrestleCrazy
Populous
Populous 2
Ports of Call
Postman Pat
Postman Pat 2
Postman Pat 3
P.O.W.
Powder
Power, The
Power Drift
PowerDrive
P. P. Hammer and his Pneumatic Weapon
Power Pinball
Powerdrome
Powermonger
Prehistoric Tale, A
Prehistorik
Premier Manager
Premier Manager 2
Premier Manager 3
Premiere
Prey: Alien Encounter
Primal Rage
Prince
Prince of Persia
Prison
Pro Flight
Pro Soccer 2190
Proflight
Project: Neptune
Project Ikarus
Project-X
Project X '93
Project X SE
Projectyle
Prophecy
Prophet, The
Prospector
Prospector in the Mazes of Xor
Puffy's Saga
Puggsy
Purple Saturn Day
Pursuit to Death
Pushover
Putty
Putty Squad
Puzznic

Q

Qix
Quadralien
Quadrel
Quantox
Quasar
Quattro Sports
Quest for Glory: So You Want to Be a Hero
Quest for Glory II: Trial by Fire
Quest of Agravain, The
Question of Sport, A
Questron
Questron 2
Quicky
Quik
Quiksilver Pinball
Qwak

R

R3
Rackney's Island
Raffles
Raiden
Railroad Tycoon
Rainbow Islands
Rainbow Warrior
Rally Championships
Rally Cross Challenge
Rally Master
Rampage
Rampart
Ramses
Ranx
RBI 2 Baseball
Reach for the Skies
Reach for the Stars
Real Genius
Real Ghostbusters, The
Realm of the Trolls
Realms
Realms of Arkania: Blade of Destiny
Rebelcharge at Chickamauga
Rectangle
Red Baron
Red Heat
Red Lightning
Red Mars
Red Storm Rising
Red Zone
Reederei
Reel Fishin'''Reflex, TheReflexityRegentRegnumRenegadeRenegade 3Renegade Legion: InterceptorReshoot RResolution 101Return of MedusaReturn to AtlantisReunionRevelationRevenge of the Mutant CamelsRick DangerousRick Dangerous 2Rings of MedusaRings of ZONRings of ZilfinRise of the DragonRise of the RobotsRiskRisky WoodsRitterRoad RashRoadkillRoadwar 2000Roadwar EuropaRobin HoodRobin Hood Legend QuestRobinson's RequiemRoboCopRoboCop 2RoboCop 3RoboSportRobot CommanderRobotsRock-A-Doodle Computerized Coloring Book, TheRock Star Ate My HamsterRock 'n' RollRocket AttackRocket RangerRoketzRockfordRod LandRogueRogue TrooperRoller Coaster RumblerRollerboardRolling RonnyRolling ThunderRomance of the Three KingdomsRomance of the Three Kingdoms IIRome: Pathway to PowerRorke's DriftRotatorRotoxRound the BendR-TypeR-Type IIRubiconRuff 'n' TumbleRuffianRules of EngagementRules of Engagement 2Running Man, TheRun the GauntletRüsselsheimSS.D.I.S.T.A.G.S.U.B.Sabre TeamSaddam Hussein Game, TheSaint DragonSamurai: Way of WarriorSanta's Xmas CaperSarakonSAS Combat SimulatorSatanSavageScary Mutant Space Aliens from MarsSchlachtfeld 2Scooby-Doo and Scrappy-DooScorched TanksScorpioScorpionScrabbleScramble SpiritsScreaming WingsSDISearchSearch for the TitanicSeaSideSecond Front: Germany Turns EastSecond SamuraiSecond WorldSecret of Monkey Island, TheSecret of the Silver BladesSensible GolfSensible SoccerSensible Train SpottingSensible World of SoccerSentinel, TheSergeant Seymour RobotcopSettlers, TheSeven Cities of Gold, TheSexy DroidsSeymour Goes to HollywoodSeymour Take OneShadow DancerShadow FighterShadow of the BeastShadow of the Beast IIShadow of the Beast IIIShadow of the Third Moon, TheShadow SorcererShadow WarriorsShadowgateShadowlandsShadoworldsShanghaiShaq FuShinobiShockwaveShogo: Mobile Armor DivisionShuffleShufflepuck CaféShuttleSideshowSidewinderSid Meier's ColonizationSid Meier's Pirates!Sierra Adventures OverviewSierra SoccerSilent ServiceSilent Service IISilicon DreamsSilkwormSimCitySimCity 2000SimEarthSimLifeSimon the SorcererSimon the Sorcerer II: The Lion, the Wizard and the WardrobeSimpsons, TheSimpsons, The: Bart vs. the Space MutantsSimpsons, The: Bart vs. the WorldSimulcraSinbad and the Throne of the FalconSink or SwimSir FredSkate of the ArtSkateballSkeleton KrewSkidmarksSkrullSkull & CrossbonesSkweekSkweeks 2: Super SkweeksSkweeks 3: Tiny SkweeksSky CabbieSky High StuntmanSky SharkSkyChaseSkyfoxSkyfox II: The Cygnus ConflictSlabsSlackskin & FlintSlam TiltSlayerSleeping Gods LieSleepwalkerSlidersSlightly MagicSluSly SpySolid GoldSmash TVSnow StrikeSoccer KidSoccer PinballSoccer Stars '96Soccer SuperstarsSoftware ManagerSoftware TycoonSol 2000 ADSoldier of LightSoliusSon Shu SiSonic BoomSooty and SweepSophelieSorcererSorcery PlusSpace: 1889Space AceSpace Ace 2Space AssaultSpace CrusadeSpace HarrierSpace Harrier IISpace HulkSpace MAXSpace Quest: The Sarien EncounterSpace Quest II: Vohaul's RevengeSpace Quest III: The Pirates of PestulonSpace Quest IV: Roger Wilco and The Time RippersSpace RogueSpace TaxiSpaceballSpacestationSpaceward Ho!Special ForcesSpeed Racer FXSpeedballSpeedball 2SpeedrunnerSpellboundSpellbound DizzySpellbreakerSpellfire the SorcererSperis LegacySphericalSpherical WorldsSpidertronicSpindizzy WorldsSpirit of AdventureSpirit of ExcaliburSpitting ImageSpoils of War, TheSpy vs. SpySpy vs. Spy 2Spy vs. Spy 3Spy Who Loved Me, TheSquibbly ShibblySt. ThomasStable MastersStar BlazeStar CommandStar ControlStar CrusaderStar Fleet I: The War BeginsStar FlightStar Trek: 25th AnniversaryStar WarsStar Wars 2Star Wars 3Star Wars: The Empire Strikes BackStarballStarBladeStarbreakerStardustStarfighterStarfighter: D'Yammen's ReignStarflightStarflight 2StargateStargliderStarglider 2StargooseStariansStarlordStarquakeStarrayStarrushStartrashSteelSteel BusinessSteel DevilsSteel EmpireSteigarSteigenberger HotelmanagerStellar 7Stellar CrusadeStone AgeSteve Davis World SnookerStoppt den Calippo FresserStorm Across EuropeStorm MasterStormlordStrangersStratagemStreet FighterStreet Fighter II: The World WarriorStreet RacerStreet RodStriderStrider 2Strike Force HarrierStrikerStrikes & Spares 3Strip Poker 3StryxStunt Car RacerStuntsStuntman SeymourSturmtruppen: The VideogameSubbuteoSuburban CommandoSubversionSubwar 2050Suicide MissionSummer CampSummer GamesSummer Games IISun CrosswordSupaplexSuper BluekidSuper CarsSuper Cars IISuper CauldronSuper Foul EggSuper Grand PrixSuper Grid RunnerSuper Hang-OnSuper Methane Bros.Super Monaco Grand PrixSuper Off RoadSuper OsWALDSuper PuffySuper Seymour Saves the PlanetSuper SkidmarksSuper Skidmarks 2Super Space InvadersSuper StardustSuper Street Fighter II: The New ChallengersSuper Street Fighter II TurboSuperfrogSuperman: The Man of SteelSuperstar Ice HockeySupremacySurf NinjasSwapSwibble DibbleSwitchbladeSwitchblade 2SWIVSwordSword of AragonSword of HonourSword of SodanSwords and GalleonsSword and the Rose, TheSwords of TwilightSyndicateTT.V. ChubbiesTaekwondo MasterTales from HeavenTales of GorluthTank AttackTanks Furry - 2016TarghanTeam SuzukiTeam YankeeTearaway ThomasTechTechno CopTechnoVentureTeenagentTeenage Mutant Ninja TurtlesTeeny WeenysTemple of ApshaiTennis CupTeresaTerminator 2 (arcade port)Terminator 2 (computer game)TerramaxTerran EnvoyTerrorpodsTerry's Big AdventureTestamentTest DriveTest Drive IITetra QuestTetrisTheatre of WarTheir Finest HourTFXTheme ParkTheme Park MysteryThexderThink CrossThink TwiceThird Courier, TheThomas the Tank Engine & Friends PinballThree Stooges, TheThromulus: The Enemy withinThunderbirdsThunder BladeThunder BurnerThunderCatsThunder ChopperThunderhawkThunderJawsTiger RoadTimekeepersTime MachineTime RaceTime ScannerTime SoldierTimes CrosswordTimes of LoreTin Toy AdventureTintin on the MoonTiny TroopsTitanTitanic BlinkyTokiTitus the FoxTom & JerryTom and the GhostTommy GunTop BananaTop Gear 2TornadoTorvak the WarriorTotal CarnageTotal FootballTotal RecallTotal War I & IITower of BabelTower of SoulsToyota Celica GTToyottes, TheTrackerTrain ItTrain: Escape To Normandy, TheTrained AssassinTransarcticaTransplantTransworldTransylvaniaTrapped 2Traps'emTraps'n'TreasuresTravel ManagerTrax WarriorTreasure Island DizzyTreasures of the Savage FrontierTreasure TrapTrex WarriorTrianGOTrinityTriple-XTritusTrivial PursuitTroddlersTrollsTronT-RacerTrump CastleTrump Castle IITubular WorldsTurbo CupTurbo OutrunTurbo Racer 3DTurborakettiTurbo Star Grand PrixTurbo TraxTurricanTurrican 2Turrican 3TuskerTwilight's RansomTwilight ZoneTwin TurbosTwinworldTwo to OneTV Sports BaseballTV Sports BasketballTV Sports BoxingTV Sports FootballTyphoonTyphoon of SteelTyphoon ThompsonTyranT-Zer0UU.N. SquadronUFO: Enemy UnknownUgh!Ultima III: ExodusUltima IV: Quest of the AvatarUltima V: Warriors of DestinyUltima VI: The False ProphetUltimate BasketballUltimate Body BlowsUltimate DartsUltimate GolfUltimate Pinball QuestUltimate Ride, TheUltimate Soccer ManagerUltimative Software Manager, TheUltimate Super SkidmarksUltra Violent WorldsUmut TarlalarıUncle D's Con-Sound-TrationUninvitedUltimate Military SimulatorUnder PressureUniversal MonstersUniversal WarriorUniversal Warrior 2UniverseUniverse 3UnrealUntouchables, TheUridium 2Uropa 2Us N' ThemUtopia: The Creation of a NationVValhalla and the Lord of InfinityValhalla: Before the WarValhalla and the Fortress of EveVampire's EmpireVaxineVector Championship RunVectorballVektor StormVengeance of ExcaliburVenus The FlytrapVermeerVerminatorVeteranVette!VictoryVictory RoadVideokidVigilanteViking ChildViking Child 2VikingsVindexVirocopVirtual GPVirtual InterceptorVirtual KartingVirtual Karting 2Vital LightVital MindVixenVolfiedVoodoo NightmareVoyagerVroomVroom MultiplayerWWacky RacesWalkerWall Street WizardWanderer 3DWar in Middle EarthWar in the GulfWar of the LanceWarheadWarlock: The AvengerWarlock's QuestWarlordsWarm Up!Warriors of ReleyneWarWizardWarzoneWasted DreamsWatchtowerWaterlooWaxworksWay of the Exploding Fist, TheWayne Gretzky Ice HockeyWeb of TerrorWEC Le MansWeird DreamsWembley International SoccerWendetta 2175WetWhale's VoyageWhale's Voyage 2Wheels on FireWheelspinWhen Two Worlds WarWhirligigWhite DeathWhizzWho Framed Roger Rabbit?Wibble World GiddyWickedWild Cup SoccerWild StreetsWild West SeymourWild West WorldWild WheelsWilliam TellWindow WizardWindwalkerWing CommanderWingNutsWingsWings of DeathWings of FuryWinnie the Pooh in the Hundred Acre WoodWinter CampWinter GamesWinter Olympiad 88WinzerWipe OutWipeout 2097WishbringerWitness, TheWiz'n'LizWizard WarzWizard's CastleWizardry VI: Bane of the Cosmic ForgeWizballWizkidWizmoWizzy's QuestWolfchildWonder Boy in Monster LandWonder DogWonderlandWoody's WorldWorld Championship SoccerWorld Cup Soccer: Italia '90World Cup USA '94World GamesWorld SoccerWorld of ArchWorlds at WarWorlds of LegendWorldwide HuntingWormsWorms: The Director's CutWorthy   (game)Wrath of the DemonWroomWWF European Rampage TourWWF WrestleManiaXXenomorphXenonXenon 2 MegablastXenophobeX-FighterX-FireXiphosX-ItXORXorron 2001X-OutXP8XPilotX-PloitXR-35 Fighter MissionXtreme RacingXybotsYYo! Joe!Yogi's Great EscapeYolandaYuppi's RevengeZZak McKracken and the Alien MindbendersZany GolfZarcanZarchZardozZarathrustaZaxxonZeewolfZeewolf IIZeppelin: Giants of the SkyZero GravityZiriaxZjyswav Hero of the Galaxy 3DZombie MassacreZombiZone WarriorZoolZool 2Zoom!Zork IZork IIZork IIIZork ZeroZ-OutZ-Out 2ZyconixZynapsZyronZzzep''

References

List: P-Z
Amiga: P-Z

tr:Amiga Oyunları